Eternal Spring is a 2022 Canadian animated documentary film, directed by Jason Loftus and released in 2022. Based around the animation of Chinese artist Daxiong, the film centres on Falun Gong's 2002 hijacking of broadcast television stations in Changchun, and China's continued repression of ethnic and religious minority groups.

The film premiered at the Thessaloniki Documentary Festival on March 15, 2022. It was subsequently screened at the 2022 Hot Docs Canadian International Documentary Festival, where it was named the overall winner of the Hot Docs Audience Award for most popular film in the festival, and the first-place winner of the Rogers Audience Award for the most popular Canadian film.

In August 2022, the film was announced as Canada's submission for the Academy Award for Best International Feature Film at the 95th Academy Awards. It was the first documentary film and the first animated film ever submitted by Canada, and only the fourth time since 1971 that a film was selected in a language other than French. On November 9, 2022, the Academy of Motion Picture Arts and Sciences officially deemed the film eligible for consideration in the Best Animated Feature category.

Reception

Critical reception
On the review aggregator website Rotten Tomatoes, the film holds an approval rating of 81% based on 31 reviews from critics, with an average rating of 7.6/10. The site's critical consensus reads, "More impressive in form than function, Eternal Spring offers a periodically gripping mixed-media account of a pivotal moment in modern Chinese history". On Metacritic, the film has a weighted average score of 71 out of 100, based on 9 reviews, indicating "generally favorable reviews".

Awards and nominations

See also
 List of submissions to the 95th Academy Awards for Best International Feature Film
 List of Canadian submissions for the Academy Award for Best International Feature Film

References

External links
 
Official website

2022 films
2022 animated films
2022 documentary films
Canadian animated documentary films
Documentary films about China
Falun Gong
Chinese-language films
2020s Canadian films